Group C of the 2015 CONCACAF Gold Cup was one of three groups competing of nations at the 2015 CONCACAF Gold Cup. The group's matches were played in July. All six group matches were played at venues in the United States. Matches were played at Chicago's Soldier Field on July 9, Glendale's University of Phoenix Stadium on July 12 and Charlotte's Bank of America Stadium on July 15.

Teams

Notes

Standings

In the quarter-finals:
Trinidad and Tobago advanced to play Panama (third-placed team of Group A).
Mexico advanced to play Costa Rica (runner-up of Group B).
Cuba (as one of the two best third-placed teams) advanced to play United States (winner of Group A).

Matches
All times EDT (UTC−4). If the venue is located in a different time zone, the local time is given in parentheses.

Trinidad and Tobago vs Guatemala

Mexico vs Cuba

Notes

Trinidad and Tobago vs Cuba

Guatemala vs Mexico

Cuba vs Guatemala

Mexico vs Trinidad and Tobago

References

External links
 

Group C